Cristian Nicolae Boldea (born 12 December 1985) is a retired Romanian professional footballer who played as a left midfielder.

Club career
Boldea made his Liga I debut playing for ACS Poli Timișoara on 19 July 2013 in a match against Dinamo București.

References

External links
 Official ACS Poli profile 

People from Oravița
Living people
1985 births
Romanian footballers
Association football midfielders
ACS Poli Timișoara players
Liga I players